is a volcanic island located around  south-southeast of Tokyo, that is part of the Volcano Islands arc.

Originally, the above-water part of the ridge of an underwater caldera, Nishinoshima was enlarged in 1974 after fresh eruptions created a new section of the island. Another eruption that began in November 2013 further enlarged the island and attracted worldwide attention. The eruptions ceased by November 2015, though emissions of volcanic gases continued for several months afterwards.

There were further eruptions in 2017, 2018, and in 2019-2020.

Etymology 
The island was named "Rosario Island" when it was discovered by the Spanish ship Rosario in 1702. That was the island's name until 1904 when the Japanese term "Nishinoshima" (literally, "West Island") was made the official name.

When a new island was formed in the 1973 eruption, that was called , but due to erosion and shifting sands, that island joined the main island and ceased to be considered a separate entity.

During the early stages of the 2013 eruption, a new volcanic island was formed southeast of the original Nishinoshima. Government officials said the island would be named "after it is stable and it is clear it will remain". As the island has now merged with Nishinoshima, "there is little possibility it will be named as a separate entity."

Geology

Morphology

Prior to 1974, Nishinoshima was a small, green island which had no eruptions in the past 10,000 years. Its main period of activity was from the Late Pleistocene to the Holocene. The volcano has many large, submarine, satellite cones to the south, west, and northeast. The southern cone rises to within  of the surface, around  SSE of Nishinoshima.

1973–1974 Eruption

A whirlpool was also seen. Another crew discovered that two black rocks were rising from the sea.

In July, the eruption continued to erupt water fountains every few minutes with white smoke rising to 100 m above sea level.

In November, a fissure eruption was noted on the new island with a chain of cinder cones running from southwest to northeast. The most recent cones were formed at the end of the chain, with the original cone being destroyed by the waves.

In December, the new island grew larger than "old" Nishinoshima. A small craterlet on the new island was also emitting lava flows.

By February 1974, the new island had developed two cinder cones at the western end of the new island, but only the eastern cinder cone was erupting. Observations on 11 January noted that the active eastern cinder cone was emitting a lava flow.

In March, the new island was still erupting; by then, the island had five cinder cones; one cinder cone was erupting red hot lava. Lava flows were still erupting from the new island's flanks. On 1 March, the five cinder cones were quiet, but a large lava flow may have still been effusing from the island's flanks. After that, the eruption ended; wave movements then joined the new and old islands.

2013–2015 eruption

In November 2013, an eruption created a new small island south-southeast off the shore of the original island. The island was considered large enough to maintain a presence above sea level for at least several years. By 20 December 2013, the island had grown fast enough that experts predicted that it would probably join up with Nishinoshima before the end of 2013 and cease to be a separate island. On 26 December 2013, the Japanese Coast Guard confirmed that the two islands had joined.

The newer portion of the island is now larger than the original Nishinoshima landmass.

During July and August 2014, lava flow increased, causing the island to expand rapidly to the east. Between September and December, the lava flow increased further and headed north, almost completely overrunning the pre-existing island, leaving only a small portion of the old island exposed. A pyroclastic cone formed around the vents which further rose the island to about 135 m (442 ft) by 23 February 2015.

The eruption continued throughout the first half of 2015, and the island continued to expand. However, by August, the volcano ceased to erupt smoke and ash, but continued to emit lava. As of 16 September 2015, the total area of the island had decreased slightly, but the fumarolic zone had expanded as "vigorous volcanic activity continued without significant change". Eruptions resumed soon thereafter, but 17 November 2015, was the date of the last observed explosive eruption. Fumarolic activity continued, but decreased in amount as no new lava flows were observed. Decreases in temperatures were also recorded, and subsidence was observed near the summit of the volcano. This would finally enable landings on the island. Water discoloration was still evident immediately offshore in August, indicating that volcanic activity, while in significant decline, was still present. On 14 February 2017, the Japan Meteorological Agency cancelled all alerts for the island, declaring that there was no indication of subsequent eruptions.

In October 2016, a team of scientists visited Nishinoshima to conduct research on the island. Apart from documenting the island's ecology and geology, monitoring equipment was also installed for future volcanic activity.

Wyss Yim, a retired professor of Earth Sciences, has theorised that the Nishinoshima eruption caused the North Pacific Blob, a mass of warm surficial water off the Pacific Coast of North America.

2017 and 2018 eruptions 

On 20 April 2017, the Japan Coast Guard confirmed explosive eruptions at the No. 7 crater at Nishinoshima and lava flows emerging from the base of volcano. Satellite imagery from 19 April also confirmed high temperatures on the island. Examination of the data revealed that the eruption likely began on 17 April. By 27 April, two lava flows had reached the sea, one on the west shore, the other on the south-west shore of the island. By 29 June, the flows had created two lobes, one extending 330 meters beyond the western shore, and other 310 to the south-west. By July, surface temperatures began to decrease until they became indistinguishable from the surroundings in August; lava flows also stopped by the end of August. On 3 October, the Coordinating Committee for Prediction of Volcanic Eruptions of the Japan Meteorological Agency announced that Nishinoshima had likely ceased erupting. Within a month, however, the zone was returned to  after small eruptions were spotted on 12 July 2018. These eruptions quickly subsided, and the no-entry zone was reduced back to 500 m on 31 October 2018.

2019-2020 eruption 

On 6 December 2019, the Japan Coast Guard confirmed explosive activity in Nishinoshima has returned, with new lava flows entering the sea by the following day. The conditions were enough that the Meteorological Agency issued a warning to passing ships to stay clear of Nishinoshima.

In January 2020, the Japan Coast Guard observations confirmed that lava was flowing out on the northeast coast. Further activity was observed on 4 February, and the northern extension of the island was expected.

As of 25 June 2020, the explosive-effusive eruption was still continuing, with lava flows on the northeastern slope of the volcano, as well as ash plumes reaching .

On 4 July, an ash plume reached  in height.

2021 eruption 
On 14 August 2021, around 6 AM, artificial satellites confirmed an eruption for the first time since late August 2020.

On 15 August 2021, the Japan Coast Guard made observations by aircraft, but no eruption was confirmed.

2022 eruption 

On 1 October 2022, satellite images confirmed that Nishinoshima had erupted again and continued to erupt until 12 October, when a Japan Coast Guard aircraft confirmed it was no longer erupting.

Ecology 
Since the 2013 eruption, biologists have expressed great interest in how Nishinoshima would be colonized by plants and wildlife. It is expected that organic matter, mainly deposited by nesting birds in the form of feathers or excrement, would enrich the island surface for plants to grow. To prevent interference of the colonization process, researchers were also advised not to bring external species to Nishinoshima.

In October 2016, a team of scientists visited Nishinoshima to examine its environment and geologic makeup for the first time up-close. Their studies have discovered that both plant and animal life continue to exist on the remaining part of the old Nishinoshima island that had not been covered by lava. An accompanying video crew from Nippon TV captured masked boobies laying eggs and a pod of dolphins (either Indo-Pacific, Tursiops aduncus, or common bottlenose, T. truncatus) swimming off the coast. Gannets, bramblings and earwigs were also discovered living on the island by researchers. Several cetaceans have been known to live around the island prior to the eruption such as spinner dolphins and short-finned pilot whales, and above mentioned bottlenose dolphin. Humpback whales had been seen before the eruption, and their recent returns have been confirmed as well. In terms of flora, plants that were present on the original island like goosegrass and purslane were found to be growing again on the "old" section of Nishinoshima.

Important Bird Area
The island and its surrounding waters has been recognised as an Important Bird Area (IBA) by BirdLife International because it supports a population of greater crested terns.

See also

 Surtsey, a new volcanic island that was formed in a similar manner off Iceland in 1963–67.
 Desert island
 Lists of islands
 List of volcanoes in Japan
 List of islands in Japan
 Fukutoku-okanoba

References

External links
Nishinoshima, Ogasawara by Geospatial Information Authority of Japan (in Japanese)
Nishinoshima eruption observed by LANDSAT 8, Geospatial Information Authority of Japan
Nishinoshima, hydrographic and oceanographic department of Japan Coast Guard (page in English)
New Japanese Island Forming in Pacific Ocean: Photos, 22 November 2013
New island at NASA's Earth Observatory website

Bonin Islands
Islands of Tokyo
Volcano Islands
Volcanoes of Tokyo
Active volcanoes
Ephemeral islands
New islands
20th-century volcanic events
21st-century volcanic events
Uninhabited islands of Japan
Submarine calderas
Important Bird Areas of the Nanpo Islands
Seabird colonies